18 Tauri is a single star in the zodiac constellation of Taurus, located 444 light years away from the Sun. It is visible to the naked eye as a faint, blue-white hued star with an apparent visual magnitude of 5.66. The star is moving further from the Earth with a heliocentric radial velocity of +4.8. It is a member of the Pleiades open cluster, which is positioned near the ecliptic and thus is subject to lunar occultations.

This is a B-type main-sequence star with a stellar classification of B8 V, and is about halfway through its main sequence lifetime. The star has 3.34 times the mass of the Sun and 2.89 times the Sun's radius. It is radiating 160 times the Sun's luminosity from its photosphere at an effective temperature of 13,748 K. 18 Tauri has a high rate of spin, showing a projected rotational velocity of 212 km/s.

References

B-type main-sequence stars
Pleiades Open Cluster
Taurus (constellation)
Durchmusterung objects
Tauri, 018
023324
017527
1144